, provisional designation: , is a Jupiter trojan from the Trojan camp, approximately  in diameter. It was discovered on 18 November 2000, by astronomers with the LINEAR program at the Lincoln Laboratory's Experimental Test Site near Socorro, New Mexico, in the United States. The dark Jovian asteroid belongs the 100 largest Jupiter trojans and has a rotation period of 23.3 hours. It has not been named since its numbering in November 2001.

Orbit and classification 

 is a Jupiter trojan in a 1:1 orbital resonance with Jupiter. It is located in the trailering Trojan camp at the Gas Giant's  Lagrangian point, 60° behind its orbit . It is also a non-family asteroid of the Jovian background population. It orbits the Sun at a distance of 4.9–5.7 AU once every 12 years and 1 month (4,419 days; semi-major axis of 5.27 AU). Its orbit has an eccentricity of 0.08 and an inclination of 30° with respect to the ecliptic.

The body's observation arc begins with a precovery published by the Digitized Sky Survey and taken at Palomar Observatory in January 1955, more than 45 years prior to its official discovery observation at Socorro.

Numbering and naming 

This minor planet was numbered by the Minor Planet Center on 30 November 2001. , it has not been named.

Physical characteristics 

 is an assumed, carbonaceous C-type asteroid. Most Jupiter trojans are D-types, with the reminder being mostly C and P-type asteroids. It has a typical V–I color index of 0.95 and a BR color of 1.23 (also see table below).

Rotation period 

Lightcurve analysis gave a rotation period of  hours with a brightness amplitude of 0.19 magnitude.

Diameter and albedo 

According to the survey carried out by the NEOWISE mission of NASA's Wide-field Infrared Survey Explorer and the Japanese Akari satellite,  measures 48.02 and 51.63 kilometers in diameter and its surface has an albedo of 0.070 and 0.080, respectively. The Collaborative Asteroid Lightcurve Link assumes a standard albedo for a carbonaceous asteroid of 0.057 and calculates a diameter of 50.77 kilometers based on an absolute magnitude of 10.2.

Notes

References

External links 
 Asteroid Lightcurve Database (LCDB), query form (info )
 Dictionary of Minor Planet Names, Google books
 Discovery Circumstances: Numbered Minor Planets (30001)-(35000) – Minor Planet Center
 Asteroid (32496) 2000 WX182 at the Small Bodies Data Ferret
 
 

032496
032496

20001118